The Gajuladinne Project (GDP) or Sanjeevaiah Sagar, is a dam on the Handri river situated about 20 km from Yemmiganur, Kurnool district, Andhra Pradesh, India.

See also
 List of dams and reservoirs in India
 List of dams and reservoirs in Andhra Pradesh

References

Dams in Andhra Pradesh
Irrigation in Andhra Pradesh
Buildings and structures in Kurnool district
2013 establishments in Andhra Pradesh
Dams completed in 2013